Zygon: When Being You Just Isn't Enough (or Zygon) is a direct-to-DVD spin-off of the long-running British science fiction television series Doctor Who. It was released direct-to-DVD and produced by the independent production company BBV. It featured the Zygons.

Overview
Zygon is an officially licensed Doctor Who spin-off made by an independent company called BBV. It is more an adult than a family film and features some nude and sex scenes. In the UK the film is rated as "18". Zygon: When Being You Just Isn’t Enough is directed by Bill Baggs. The film is starring Jo Castleton as Lauren Anderson, Daniel Harcourt as Michael Kirkwood/Kritakh, and Keith Drinkel as Bob Calhoun/Torlakhl. Jo Castleton character Lauren Anderson had previously appeared in another BBV film called Cyberon. The earlier drafts of the film were written by Lance Parkin and Jonathan Blum. Bill Baggs rewrote the script. There were many significant changes to the action and characterisation and how they were presented on-screen. Parkin and Blum didn't feel that the changed script represented their story well. Thus, they had taken their name off the picture. Most of the film had been shot in 2003. According to Blum Baggs had done one more day of shooting in 2007 to finish the film. The film was released on DVD in 2008. The DVD also included the documentary Zygon – Behind The Changing Faces. It is a making of documentary, that includes deleted scenes and out-takes.

Story
Michael Kirkwood goes to the psychiatrist, Dr Lauren Anderson. He has nightmares about being a shape-shifting alien called the Zygon. Lauren wants to help Michael to find out what these dreams mean. Soon she meets another Zygon disguised as the serial killer Bob Calhoun. The Zygon, who introduces himself as Torlakhl kills Lauren's roommate and turns Lauren into a Zygon. He hopes that this way Lauren will help Michael Kirkwood to find out who he really is, the Zygon Kritakh. Kritakh was sent to Earth with Torlakhl to finish a mission. Kritakh has disguised himself as a human for too long and he has forgotten who he is. Eventually, Kritakh remembers who he is but he does not want to complete the mission. Instead, he plans to spend his life with Lauren. Torlakhl is angry. Disguised as Lauren he kills her colleague on camera. Lauren is blamed for the murder. She kills Torlakhl who still looks like her. The police find the body of Torlakhl and thinks it is Lauren. Lauren watches the scene and leaves.

Cast
 Jo Castleton – Lauren Anderson
 Daniel Harcourt – Michael Kirkwood / Kritakh
 Keith Drinkel – Bob Calhoun / Torlakhl
 David Roeciffe – Ray
 Becky Pennick – Joanna
 Alistair Lock – Samms
 Nigel Fairs – Police Officer

Critical reception

References

External links
 

2008 fantasy films
2008 science fiction films
Bill & Ben Video
British science fiction films
2008 films
British direct-to-video films